The Hungary national speedway team are motorcycle speedway national team from Hungary.  They were 3rd in 2006 European Pairs Speedway Championship.

2008 Team Squad

Speedway World Cup

Riders

European Pairs Championship

Team U-21 World Championship

Honours

European Championships

References 
 Świat Żużla, No 1 (75) /2008, pages 24-25, .

See also 
 motorcycle speedway

National speedway teams
Speedway
Speedway